Chrysomyxa ledicola is a plant pathogen responsible for the disease large-spored spruce-Labrador tea rust.  It affects white spruce, black spruce, Sitka spruce, Engelmann spruce, and Labrador-tea.  It is also the cause of the orange goo that covered the Iñupiat village of Kivalina, Alaska in the summer of 2011.

References

External links 
 
 
 USDA ARS Fungal Database

ledicola
Fungal plant pathogens and diseases
Fungi described in 1893